The Șugag Dam is a large hydroelectric dam on the river Sebeș situated in Romania. It creates the reservoir Lake Tău Bistra.

See also 
 List of power stations in Romania

External links 
 Description 

Dams in Romania